Morrison Stadium is a 6,000-seat soccer-specific stadium located between 17th and 19th Streets to the north of Cass Street, on the east side of the Creighton University campus in the NoDo neighborhood of Omaha, Nebraska.  The main entrance and ticket window is located on the west side, at the intersection of California and Florence Blvd. (19th Street).
The stadium is home to the Creighton Bluejays men's and women's soccer teams.

History
Designed by architectural firm DLR Group, the stadium opened in the fall of 2003 as the Creighton Soccer Field.  During this season, the facility was limited to the artificial playing surface and berm seating located on the east side of the field.  The grandstand, reserved seating, upper-level suites, press box, and video board were completed in the fall of 2004 when the facility was renamed Michael G. Morrison, S.J. Stadium after the university's former president. The first goal scored in NCAA Competition was scored by US Soccer Legend Clint Dempsey on August 31, 2003, for Furman University.

Events

In eleven seasons (through 2013) at Morrison Stadium, the Creighton men's soccer team owns an 89-17-13 record, while the Creighton women's soccer team has a 60-24-14 record. Additionally, the men are 11–2 in NCAA tournament games at Morrison Stadium.

Morrison Stadium hosted the Missouri Valley Conference men's soccer tournament in 2004, 2007, and 2011 and the women's soccer conference tournament in 2005, 2006, 2008, 2009, 2010, and 2012.

Morrison Stadium is also the host for the Boys and Girls Nebraska High School Class A and Class B Soccer State Championships in May. The attendance at the 2013 Class A Boys Soccer State Championship, won by Omaha South High over Creighton Prep, was estimated at 8,200, making it the highest attended soccer match ever in the state of Nebraska.

In addition to hosting local soccer exhibition games, Creighton University and Morrison Stadium also host a variety of non-soccer events including concerts, the Omaha Symphony, opening ceremonies for Nebraska Special Olympics, and other outdoor events.

International matches 
Morrison Stadium hosted the state of Nebraska's first international friendly on July 13, 2010 where the women's national soccer teams of the United States and Sweden played to a 1-1 draw.

See also
 Creighton University
 Sports in Omaha, Nebraska
 TD Ameritrade Park
 Rosenblatt Stadium
 CenturyLink Center Omaha
 Omaha Civic Auditorium
 Mid-America Center

References

External links
Creightion Bluejays men's soccer media guide (PDF)

Sports venues completed in 2003
Sports venues in Omaha, Nebraska
Soccer venues in Nebraska
College soccer venues in the United States
Creighton Bluejays soccer
2003 establishments in Nebraska